Stephen Douglas Carls is chair of the history department at Union University in Jackson, Tennessee.  Carls began teaching at Union University in 1983, and before that, taught at Sterling College in Sterling, Kansas for twelve years.  He is a specialist of modern France, the First World War, and Europe between the two world wars.

A member of Phi Alpha Theta History Honor Society since 1970, Carls has been the advisor to Union University’s Delta-Psi chapter since 1983. Nationally, he has served the society as a council member (2006-2008), advisory board member (2008-2012), vice president (2012-2014), president (2014-2016), and chair of the advisory board (2016-2018). Phi Alpha Theta’s national office has given service awards to Carls twice (2010 and 2014) for his dedication to the organization. At its biennial convention in San Antonio in January 2020, the society named Carls an honorary dean of Phi Alpha Theta.

Carls is a member of the American Historical Association, Southern Historical Association, Society for French Historical Studies, and West Tennessee Historical Society. From 1996 to 2008, he served as the faculty advisor to the Lambda Chi Alpha fraternity at Union University.

Biographical information

Carls was born in Minneapolis, Minnesota, in 1944 to Ernest and Eleanor Carls. He is married to Alice-Catherine Maire. They have three children: Philip, Elizabeth, and Paul.

Scholarship
Carls wrote the preeminent book on the life of Louis Loucheur. Stephen Schuker of the University of Virginia called it “a superb biography of one of the most fascinating and forward-looking leaders of the Third Republic.” “[Carls] offers a highly original and important contribution to the study of modernization in twentieth-century France.” In this book called Louis Loucheur and the Shaping of Modern France, 1916-1931, Carls proposes that Loucheur, a World War I weapons manufacturer who turned to politics, was a first-generation technocrat and a major player in France’s postwar industrialization and modernization.  An expanded version of the book was published in France under the title Louis Loucheur: Ingénieur, homme d’état, modernisateur de la France, 1872-1931.  Carls has also coauthored with his wife a textbook titled Europe from War to War, 1914-1945, that Routledge released in 2017. A French translation of the book titled L'Europe d'une guerre à l'autre: 1914-1945 was published in 2020 by the Presses universitaires du Septentrion.

Education

B.A. from Wheaton College (1966)
M.A. (1968) and Ph.D. (1982) from the University of Minnesota.

Selected works

Louis Loucheur and the Shaping of Modern France, 1916-1931. Baton Rouge: Louisiana State University Press, 1993.
Louis Loucheur: Ingénieur, homme d’état, modernisateur de la France, 1872-1931. Translated by Alice-Catherine Carls. Preface by Emmanuel Chadeau. Villeneuve d’Ascq : Presses universitaires du Septentrion, 2000.
Coauthored with Alice-Catherine Carls. Europe from War to War, 1914-1945. London: Routledge, 2018.
Coauthored with Alice-Catherine Carls. L'Europe d'une guerre à l'autre: 1914-1945. Translated by Alice-Catherine Carls.Villeneuve d’Ascq : Presses universitaires du Septentrion, 2020.

References

External links 
 Faculty page at Union University

Living people
Year of birth missing (living people)
University of Minnesota alumni
Wheaton College (Illinois) alumni